Asgar Khani (also Romanized as ‘Asgar Khānī; also known as ‘Asgar Khān and Shahīd Şadūqī) is a village in Howmeh-ye Sarpol Rural District, in the Central District of Sarpol-e Zahab County, Kermanshah Province, Iran. At the 2006 census, its population was 220, in 46 families.

References 

Populated places in Sarpol-e Zahab County